The Children Act 1989 (Amendment) (Female Genital Mutilation) Act 2019 (c. 10) is an Act of Parliament of the United Kingdom which amends the Children Act 1989 to change the designation of proceedings under the Female Genital Mutilation Act 2003 as "family proceedings".

Background 
Zac Goldsmith, in the Second Reading debate in the House of Commons, stated in relation to female genital mutilation court proceedings, "that is clearly an omission in the law, and it means that our courts do not have the full suite of powers necessary to protect girls who are at risk."

The House of Commons Library notes that FGM has been illegal since 1985 and the most recent Female Genital Mutilation Act was introduced in 2003.  Despite this there have been no successful prosecutions for FGM in the UK.

Keith Vaz, then the Chair of the Home Affairs Select Committee, "It is shocking that 28 years on from female genital mutilation first being made a criminal offence, there has not yet been a successful prosecution in the UK. The Committee's inquiry will seek to find out why this is the case, as well as considering what more needs to be done to protect at risk girls."

Provisions 
This Act makes proceedings under the Female Genital Mutilation Act 2003 to occur in family courts in England and Wales.

See also 

 Female genital mutilation in the United Kingdom
 Female Genital Mutilation Act 2003

References 

United Kingdom Acts of Parliament 2019
2019 in British law
Female genital mutilation in the United Kingdom
Family law in the United Kingdom
English family law